This is a list of unsolved murders in Canada. Hundreds of homicides occur across Canada each year, many of which end up as cold cases.

Individual victims

Multiple victims 
Unsolved murder cases where numerous victims are tied to an event/pattern or series of events (e.g., mass murders, serial killings).

References

External links 

 RCMP Cold Case Files
 Canada Unsolved, investigative blog/database
 Cold Cases: Unsolved Crimes in Canada, CBC Archives

 

+
+
+
+
+
+
+
+
+
+
+
People murdered in Newfoundland and Labrador
Lists of murders
unsolved murders